The Kursk Oblast Duma is the regional parliament of Kursk Oblast, a federal subject of Russia. A total of 45 deputies are elected for five-year terms.

Elections

2021

References

Kursk Oblast
Politics of Kursk Oblast